Belovsky District is an administrative and municipal district (raion), one of the twenty-eight in Kursk Oblast, Russia. It is located in the south of the oblast. Its administrative center is the rural locality (a sloboda) of Belaya. Population:  22,182 (2002 Census);  The population of Belaya accounts for 14.5% of the district's total population.

Geography
Belovsky District is located on the south-central edge of Kursk Oblast, on the border with Belgorod Oblast to the south.  The terrain is a hilly plain averaging 200 meters above sea level; the district lies on the Orel-Kursk plateau of the Central Russian Upland.  The main river in the district is the Psel River, which flows southwest from the district into Ukraine, where it empties into the Dnieper River.  The Psel is typically frozen from December to early March.  Belovsky District is 60 km south of the city of Kursk, and 520 km south of Moscow.  The area measures 40 km (north-south), and 38 km (west-east); total area is 950 km2 (about 3.2% of Kursk Oblast).  The administrative center is the town of Belaya.

The district is bordered on the north by Bolshesoldatsky District, on the east by Oboyansky District, on the south by Krasnoyaruzhsky District, Rakityansky District, and Ivnyansky District of Belgorod Oblast, and on the west by Sudzhansky District.

References

Notes

Sources

External links
Belovsky District on Google Maps
Belovsky District on OpenStreetMap

Districts of Kursk Oblast